William James Spiers III (born June 5, 1966) is a former infielder in Major League Baseball who played primarily as a shortstop and third baseman from 1989 to 2001. He is currently an assistant football coach for Clemson.  He was also a punter for Clemson University. He was a first round draft pick (13th overall) in the 1987 amateur draft. He debuted in the majors two years later with the Milwaukee Brewers on April 7, 1989.

On September 24, 1999, while playing with the Houston Astros, Spiers was attacked by a 23-year-old man while standing in the outfield before the bottom of the 6th inning. Teammate Mike Hampton was first on the scene and delivered several kicks to the attacker. He was later quoted saying "The good thing was he didn't have a weapon... I always check right field before I deliver the first pitch. It's just a habit. I looked out there and saw the guy on Billy's back... It was a scary thing. My instincts just took over. My rage took over. I was pretty furious. I wanted to get him off my teammate." After being arrested the attacker faced two counts of battery and one count of disorderly conduct.  Spiers wound up with a welt under his left eye, a bloody nose and whiplash. 

As of 2016, Spiers is an offensive assistant at Clemson University Football, where he is also pursuing his graduate degree.

In 2020, Spiers was Clemson Football Senior Assistant, Offense & Special Teams

On May 21, 2007 Spiers was inducted into the South Carolina Athletics Hall of Fame. He is now coaching both baseball and football. 

His son, Will, is a punter for the Clemson football team.

External links

1966 births
Living people
Major League Baseball infielders
Milwaukee Brewers players
New York Mets players
Houston Astros players
Baseball players from South Carolina
Major League Baseball third basemen
Major League Baseball second basemen
Major League Baseball shortstops
Clemson Tigers baseball players
Clemson Tigers football players
Beloit Brewers players
Denver Zephyrs players
El Paso Diablos players
Helena Brewers players
Clemson Tigers football coaches
Norfolk Tides players
Stockton Ports players